Bayram is both a masculine Turkish given name and a Turkish surname. Notable people with the name include:

Given name
Bairam Khan, advisor and prime minister to Akbar the Great
Bayram Malkan (born 1994), Turkish amateur boxer
Bayram Şit (born 1930), Turkish Olympic wrestler and trainer
Hacı Bayram-ı Veli (1352–1430), Turkish Sufi
Mahmud Bayram al-Tunisi (1893–1961), Egyptian poet

Surname
Aslı Bayram (born 1981), German actress and model of Turkish descent
Canan Bayram (born 1966), German politician
 Mohamed Bayram II (1748–1831), Tunisian scholar and cleric of Turkish descent
Ömer Bayram (born 1991), Turkish professional footballer

Turkish-language surnames
Turkish masculine given names